The Swan (orig. Icelandic Svanurinn) is a novel written by the Icelandic writer Guðbergur Bergsson in 1991.

Plot introduction
The story is about a nine-year-old girl sent to a country farm in Iceland to serve her probation for shoplifting (which is a characteristic Icelandic sentence). In the novel, the girl finds a kind of freedom by submitting to the inevitable restraints and suffering of remote rural life.

Awards and nominations
In 1991, Guðbergur Bergsson got the Icelandic Literary Prize for his novel, Svanurinn.
In 1992, Svanurinn was nominated for the Literary Prize of the Nordic Council.

Translation
This is one of the few novels by Guðbergur Bergsson that are available in English. The English version is translated by Bernard Scudder, a member of the team producing an English translation of the Icelandic Sagas.

Adaptation 
In 2017, the Icelandic film director Ása Helga Hjörleifsdóttir shot her first movie The Swan, the adaptation of The Swan.

References

1991 novels
Icelandic novels
Novels set in Iceland
Icelandic-language novels